Asinum was possibly a king of Assyria during the 18th century BC, and a grandson of Shamshi-Adad I. He was overthrown by Puzur-Sin because he was of Amorite extraction; not included in the standard King List, but attested in Puzur-Sin's inscription. It is unclear whether Asinum was a personal name or a title.

References

18th-century BC Assyrian kings
Amorite kings